Cisy may refer to the following places in Poland:
Cisy, Podlaskie Voivodeship (north-east Poland)
Cisy, Bytów County in Pomeranian Voivodeship (north Poland)
Cisy, Malbork County in Pomeranian Voivodeship (north Poland)
Cisy, Warmian-Masurian Voivodeship (north Poland)